In the 2010–11 season of competitive football (soccer) in Cape Verde:  No Cape Verdean Cup took place that year.

Diary of the season
No competition from the Brava Island League, Cup or the Opening Tournament
December 7 Beira-Mar do Tarrafal of Santiago celebrated its 25th anniversary
February 6–11: No sports competitions due to the parliamentary elections that took place
Sport Sal Rei Club won their 8th title for Boa Vista
Vulcânicos won their 8th title for Fogo
Onze Unidos won their 9th and recent title for Maio
Académico do Aeroporto won their 11th title for Sal
Benfica won their only title for Santiago North
Boa Vista won their 1st title for Santiago South
Rosariense Clube won their 3rd and recent title (5th overall for Santo Antão) for Santo Antão North
Académica do Porto Novo won their 5th title (6th overall) for Santo Antão South
FC Ultramarina won their 9th title for São Nicolau
CS Mindelense won their 45th title for São Vicente
May 1: SC África Show won their only cup title for Boa Vista
Académica do Sal won their second and recent cup title for Sal
May 5: Vulcânicos won their cup title for Fogo
May 14: 2011 Cape Verdean Football Championships began
May 15: Mindelense defeated Vulcânicos 6-0 and made it the season's highest scoring match
June 11:
Boavista Praia defeated Rosariense 6-0 and made it the season's one of two highest scoring matches
Match between Vulcânicos and Sal Rei was cancelled
June 12: Regular season ends, Académica Porto Novo, Académico do Aeroporto do Sal, Sporting Praia and Mindelense qualified into the playoffs
June 18: Knockout stage begins
June 25: Mindelense and Sporting Praia qualified into the finals
July 2: Championship finals begins
July 9: CS Mindelense won their 6th national championship title

Final standings

Cape Verdean Football Championships

CS Mindelense and Académica do Porto Novo were first in each group, second place Group A club Sporting Clube da Praia advanced with 12 points and second place Group B club Académico do Aeroporto advanced with 8 points and third in the most goals numbering 8.  Sporting advanced to the finals with 5 goals scored while Mindelense advanced with 2 goals scored away in the first match. Mindelense defeated Sporting with only 0-1 in the first match while the second was scoreless, Mindelense went to win their 8th title.

Group A

Group B

Final Stages

Leading goalscorer: Fufura - 5 goals

Island or regional competitions

Regional Championships

Regional Cups

Regional Super Cups
The 2010 champion winner played with a 2010 cup winner (when a club won both, a second place club competed).

Regional Opening Tournaments

Notable debutants
Mailó, 18 year old centre forward

Transfer deals

Summer-Fall transfer window
The September/October transfer window runs from the end of the previous season in September up to October.
 Aires Marques from CS Mindelense to  Sertanense F.C.
 Ballack from Barcelona to Sporting Clube da Praia
 Caló from SC Santa Maria to Sporting Clube da Praia
 Figo from Sporting Clube da Praia to Estrela dos Amadores (Tarrafal)
 Fredson from  Varzim (on loan with  Pampilhosa) to Batuque
 Kuca from Boavista Praia to  SC Mirandela
 Patas from Estrela dos Amadores (Tarrafal) to  Águias Morada
 Sténio from CS Mindelense to  C.D. Feirense
 Vozinha from Batuque FC to CS Mindelense

Spring transfer window
 Mailó from CS Mindelense to FC Ultramarina

See also
2010 in Cape Verde
2011 in Cape Verde
Timeline of Cape Verdean football

References

 
 
2010 in association football
2011 in association football